Viešintos is a town in Anykščiai district municipality, in Utena County, in northeast Lithuania. According to the 2011 census, the town has a population of 281 people. Town established near Viešinta river.

Buildings and structures
 246 metres tall guyed mast for FM-/TV-broadcasting

References

Towns in Utena County
Towns in Lithuania
Vilkomirsky Uyezd
Anykščiai District Municipality